Derry Hayes (1927 – 18 March 2005) was an Irish  hurler who played for Cork Championship club Blackrock. He played for the Cork senior hurling team for three years, during which time he usually lined out in the half-back line.

Honours

Blackrock
Cork Junior Hurling Championship (1): 1947

Cork
All-Ireland Senior Hurling Championship (2): 1953, 1954
Munster Senior Hurling Championship (2): 1953, 1954

External links
Tribute to Derry Hayes

1927 births
2005 deaths
Blackrock National Hurling Club hurlers
Cork inter-county hurlers